Charles Benton (February 13, 1931 – April 29, 2015) was an American executive who served as the CEO and Chairman of the Board of the Benton Foundation and former CEO of Public Media Incorporated, a film and video publisher and distributor.

Early life
Benton was born in New York City in 1931, the son of William and Helen Benton. Growing up, he stayed in New York and Connecticut in the summer, Chicago's south side during the winter, and in the spring Arizona. Benten graduated from Deerfield Academy in Massachusetts and received a bachelor's degree in 1953 from Yale University, and did post graduate work at Northwestern University.

Career
Benton led the Foundation through its evolution from a grantmaking to an operating foundation devoted generally to the field of communications. 
In 1978, President Carter appointed Charles as chairman of the National Commission on Libraries and Information Science and as chairman of the first White House Conference on Library and Information Services, held in November 1979.
In 1980, he was re-appointed for an additional five-year term, during which time he was elected chairman emeritus by unanimous vote of NCLIS commissioners. 
From the fall of 1997 to December 1998, Charles was a member of the Presidential Advisory Committee on Public Interest Obligations of Digital Television Broadcasters, (Gore Commission).
In 2004, Benton and his wife, Marjorie Craig Benton, received the Distinguished Grantmaker Award from the Council on Foundations, for lifetime achievement. In 2005, Public Media, Inc. was acquired by Image Entertainment. Benton retained ownership of Public Media Education, LLC.

Personal life and death
Benton met Marjorie Craig at Yale who had been a student at Connecticut College for Women. He married Marjorie in 1953. They were together for 62 years until his death. He died April 29, 2015, aged 84, of complications of renal cancer in Evanston, Illinois in his home.

References

External links
Benton Foundation
"Charles and Marjorie Benton", Foundation News and Commentary, Paula J. Kelly
 

Digital divide activists
Yale University alumni
Northwestern University alumni
2015 deaths
American nonprofit chief executives
1931 births
Deerfield Academy alumni